DeltaSync was a proprietary Microsoft communications protocol for synchronizing web services with offline clients. It was switched off by Microsoft on 30 June 2016.

Windows Live Hotmail was connected to offline clients using DeltaSync; Outlook Connector and the Windows Live Mail client use it for offline access. Microsoft pushed for this protocol instead of POP3 or IMAP4 for supporting various advanced features, like contacts, calendar, and notes synchronization. Using the DeltaSync protocol, Microsoft intended to provide a common platform for any compatible device to implement a client which can two-way synchronize mail, contacts, calendar, and notes.

History 
In January 2007, Microsoft announced DeltaSync as the replacement for WebDAV. In April 2008, Microsoft sent an email warning that WebDAV would no longer be supported after 30 June 2008. However, in May 2008, Microsoft stated that it would be "postponing the transition deadline previously announced" to allow customers more time to "evaluate alternative solutions". In June 2009, Microsoft announced that WebDAV support would finally end on 1 September 2009.

Format details 

The DeltaSync compression code produces a stream with a four byte magic number of "HU01", followed by the stream header.

HU01 header 

Following this header is a series of compressed data blocks with the following structure.

SCBH header 

This is followed by 256 bytes of decompression table and finally the actual compressed data.

Discontinuation
Since Microsoft migrated the Outlook.com mail to use a structure based on Office 365, the DeltaSync protocol was discontinued on 30 June 2016, and mail will not be able to be synced using Windows Live Mail after that time. Google's Gmail and some other providers' mail services still work with DeltaSync.
Although DeltaSync has sunk, Microsoft's Windows Live Mail 2011 and 2012 continue to work with Hotmail e-mail accounts, by using IMAP (or, less effectively, POP) in place of DeltaSync.

See also 
 Windows Live Hotmail
 Windows Live Mail
 Microsoft Office Outlook
 Microsoft Office Outlook Connector

References

External links 
Daniel Parnell is reverse engineering DeltaSync
Daniel Parnell has released the source for DeltaSync decompression code
another person reverse engineering DeltaSync
Independently-supported Java implementation of DeltaSync

Windows Live